Oiceoptoma thoracicum, the red-breasted carrion beetle, is a species of carrion beetle in the family Silphidae. It is found in the Palearctic. As a carrion beetle, this species is a generalist that can have importance in forensic entomology. Larval survival to adulthood occurs most often if the beetles are fed pork compared to beef or chicken.

References

External links

 

Silphidae
Beetles described in 1758
Palearctic insects